Valevåg is a village in Sveio municipality in Vestland county, Norway.  The village is located on the northern end of the Sveio peninsula, along the southern shore of the Hardangerfjorden.  Historically, Valevåg was the administrative centre of the old municipality of Valestrand until it was merged into Sveio in 1964.  Valen Chapel (built in 1707) is in the village of Valevåg, and just outside the village to the south is the much larger Valestrand Church (built in 1873).

Transportation
The village was once a major ferry port connecting the mainland of Sveio to the island municipalities of Stord (to the north via the Skjersholmane–Valevåg Ferry) and to Bømlo (to the west via the Mosterhamn–Valevåg Ferry). The ferrys are no longer in operation since the opening of the Triangle Link bridge/tunnel network. The Bømlafjord Tunnel runs directly beneath the village before going under the fjord to the nearby islands.

References

Villages in Vestland
Sveio